= Bolshoy Kanimasur mine =

Silver mine in Sughd, Tajikistan

Location
- Location: Sughd Province, Tajikistan

Production
- Products: silver

The Bolshoy Kanimasur mine is a large silver mine located in the Sughd Province of Tajikistan. Bolshoy Kanimasur is one largest silver reserves in Tajikistan, having estimated reserves of 1.57 billion oz of silver.
